Kay Cleaver Strahan (January 4, 1888 – August 14, 1941) was an American writer of short stories and mystery novels. She created the character of the "crime analyst" Lynn McDonald.

Biography
Strahan was born in La Grande, Oregon, on January 4, 1888, the daughter of Dr. Alonzo Cleaver and Laura Bryson.

She moved to Portland, Oregon, in 1895.

Strahan married William Nicholas Strahan.

In 1918 she began writing, contributing short stories to Collier's, The American, Good Housekeeping, Ladies Home Journal, The Delineator, Munsey's, and others. 

She was also a mystery murder novelist, among her books: Peggy Mary (1915), Something That Begins with "T" (1918), The Desert Moon Mystery (1927), Footprints (1929), Death Traps (1930), Three Kinds of Love (1931), October House (1932), The Meriwether Mystery (1932), The Hobgoblin Murder (1934), The Desert Lake Mystery (1936). She created the character of the "seasoned crime analyst" Lynn McDonald. Her book Footprints won the Scotland Yard Prize for the best Mystery and Detective Story of the Year; the contest was held by The Crime Club and the winner received the prize of $2500 ($ in  dollars). The three Crime Club judges who chose Footprints were Will Cuppy, William Rose Benet and Grant Overton. She used Oregon settings for much of her writing and generally provided a surprise ending. Alice Hamilton wrote in her private letters that she was reading Strahan.

She lived at 1084 Wilson St., Portland, Oregon.

She died on August 14, 1941.

References

1888 births
1941 deaths
American women writers
Writers from Portland, Oregon
People from La Grande, Oregon